is a 1944 Japanese  historical film directed by Hiroshi Inagaki. The story centers on Takasugi Shinsaku's trip to China to foster alliances to resist Western imperialism in Asia. It was a Japan–China co-production made during the Japanese occupation of Shanghai during World War II.

Cast
 Tsumasaburō Bandō as Shinsaku Takasugi 
 Ryūnosuke Tsukigata as Saisuke Godai
 Tatsuya Ishiguro as Kuranosuke Nakamuta 
 Ryōsuke Kagawa as Heirokurō Numata 
 Ryōnosuke Azuma as Shakusaburō Ōtsuka
 Yoshimatsu Nakamura as Shen Yizhou

References

External links

1944 films
1940s historical films
Japanese epic films
Japanese historical films
Films directed by Hiroshi Inagaki
Japanese black-and-white films
1940s Japanese-language films